Hati Bangai is a village development committee in Rupandehi District in Lumbini Province of southern Nepal. At the time of the 1991 Nepal census it had a population of 3278 people living in 521 individual households. It is a developing city.

References

Populated places in Rupandehi District